Bang Eun-jung is a South Korean actress. She is known for her roles in dramas such as The Sensible Life of Director Shin, My Roommate Is a Gumiho, No Bad Days, Peng and she also appeared in movies Park Hwa-young, Start-Up and You're So Precious to Me.

Filmography

Television series

Film

Music video appearances

References

External links 
 
 

1992 births
Living people
21st-century South Korean actresses
South Korean television actresses
South Korean film actresses